Tanner's Creek Generating Station (also spelled Tanners Creek) was a major, 1000-MWe coal-fired electrical power plant in Indiana. Located on the north bank of Ohio River along Tanners Creek, it was one of the two coal-fired power stations within  of Lawrenceburg, Indiana, near the tripoint of Indiana, Ohio, and Kentucky (the other plant being the Miami Fort Power Station in the neighboring Ohio). The former plant is situated directly across the Ohio river from Petersburg, Boone County, Kentucky. Tanner's Creek was one of the two Indiana coal power plants owned by Indiana Michigan Power, a subsidiary of American Electric Power (the other plant being Rockport Generating Station near Rockport, Indiana).

On March 17, 2015, Indiana Michigan Power announced that the Tanners Creek plant would be completely shut down by May 31, 2015. The former plant was sold to St. Louis–based Commercial Development Company in October 2016. The Port of Indiana commission is studying converting the former plant into the state's fourth port.

Units
Units 1 and 2, rated at 145 MWe all-year capacity, were launched in 1951–1952.
Unit 3, rated at 200 MWe (summer) and 205 MWe (winter) capacity, was launched in the end of 1954.
The largest and newest Unit 4, rated at 500 MWe all-year capacity, was launched in mid-1964.

Environmental impact
With three out of four of its units dating back to the 1950s, the plant was ranked 67th on the United States list of dirtiest power plants in terms of sulphur dioxide emissions per megawatt-hour of electrical energy produced in 2006.

See also

 List of power stations in Indiana

References

External links
http://www.indianamichiganpower.com/about/serviceTerritory
http://eaglecountryonline.com/local-article/tanners-creek-power-plant-will-shut-layoff-employees-may-31/

Energy infrastructure completed in 1951
Energy infrastructure completed in 1952
Energy infrastructure completed in 1954
Energy infrastructure completed in 1964
Buildings and structures in Dearborn County, Indiana
Coal-fired power stations in Indiana
Former coal-fired power stations in the United States
1951 establishments in Indiana
2015 disestablishments in Indiana
Former power stations in Indiana
American Electric Power